Ján Slovenčiak (born 5 November 1981) is a Slovak football goalkeeper who currently plays for LP Domino. 

He joined FC Spartak Trnava in January 2010.

References

1981 births
Living people
Slovak footballers
Royal Excel Mouscron players
FC Spartak Trnava players
Slovak Super Liga players
FC Senec players

Association football goalkeepers